In mathematics, Lebesgue's density theorem states that for any Lebesgue measurable set , the "density" of A is 0 or 1 at almost every point in . Additionally, the "density" of A is 1 at almost every point in A.   Intuitively, this means that the "edge" of A, the set of points in A whose "neighborhood" is partially in A and partially outside of A, is negligible.

Let μ be the Lebesgue measure on  the Euclidean space Rn and A be a Lebesgue measurable subset of Rn. Define the approximate density of A in a ε-neighborhood of a point x  in Rn as

where Bε denotes the closed ball of radius ε centered at x.

Lebesgue's density theorem asserts that for almost every point x of A the density

exists and is equal to 0 or 1.

In other words, for every measurable set A, the density of A is 0 or 1 almost everywhere in Rn.

For example, given a square in the plane, the density at every point inside the square is 1, on the edges is 1/2, and at the corners is 1/4.  The set of points in the plane at which the density is neither 0 nor 1 is non-empty (the square boundary), but it is negligible.

The Lebesgue density theorem is a particular case of the Lebesgue differentiation theorem.

Thus, this theorem is also true for every finite Borel measure on Rn instead of Lebesgue measure, see Discussion.

See also

References

 Hallard T. Croft. Three lattice-point problems of Steinhaus. Quart. J. Math. Oxford (2), 33:71-83, 1982.

Theorems in measure theory
Integral calculus